Matelea is a genus of flowering plants in the family Apocynaceae. It contains about 200 species, which are commonly known as milkvines. Some people consider Chthamalia to be a synonym to or a subgenus of Matelea.

Selected species

Formerly placed here
 Gonolobus suberosus (L.) R.Br. (as M. gonocarpos (Walter) Shinners or M. suberosa (L.) Shinners)

References

External links
Jepson Manual Treatment

 
Apocynaceae genera
Taxonomy articles created by Polbot